Isla Mujeres National Airport  is an airport located on the Isla Mujeres in the Isla Mujeres Municipality in the State of Quintana Roo, Mexico. The airport is primarily used for general aviation, and occasionally by the Mexican Armed Forces. No commercial service is currently offered from the airport, although there is a small terminal and control tower, which is currently abandoned and has been vandalized. The nearest airport with commercial service is Cancún International Airport, located on the mainland.

Facilities and aircraft
The airport is located in the northern portion of the island, and contains one runway made of asphalt.

General aviation, chartered flights and military operations are the only activities the airport sees, with no scheduled passenger service available.

References

Airports in Quintana Roo